In accordance with Iraqi law, citizens of most countries require a visa to visit Iraq. However, visitors from certain countries are given a visa on arrival in select airports and certain countries are banned from entering Iraq.

On the 15th of March 2021, the Iraqi government lifted pre-arrival visa requirements for citizens from 37 countries, allowing citizens from those countries to apply for on-arrival visas at approved land, sea and air border crossings.

Iraqi government launched a e-visa site, however it's not clear if all citizens in the world can apply; for now only citizens of Germany, Turkey and Egypt can apply.

Visa policy map

Visa exemption

Citizens of  can visit Iraq without a visa for up to 30 days.

Visa on arrival

Nationals of the following countries may obtain a visa on arrival at Al Najaf International Airport and Basra International Airport, or otherwise as noted:

Citizens of the following countries can get visa on arrival at any entry point land, sea, and air.

Non-ordinary passports

A visa is not required for holders of diplomatic or service passports for nationals of

Iraqi-Kurdistan
According to the KRG Representative Office in Vienna, visitors to the Kurdistan Region may get visa-free stamp for up to 30 days. Travelers by car need to pay a $30 road tax.

WARNING: This visa stamp is not valid at any place in the rest of Iraq outside of Iraqi-Kurdistan area which are Duhok, Erbil and Sulaymaniyah only. Exiting the regions of Iraqi-Kurdistan with this visa stamp to other city in Iraq may expose the visitor to a fine, deportation and prevent the person from entering Iraq for a period of two years or more. If you are planning to visit all parts of Iraq without worries, it is preferable to travel to Baghdad airport, Basra, Najaf, or any border crossing other than the Iraqi Kurdistan crossing points, after that, you will have absolute freedom to move around Iraq from the far north to the far south without any restrictions or conditions.

Eligible countries :

The visit visa is extendable and can be converted to a work visa. The total validity would be 45 days from the date of the entry. This extension can be applied twice, not more than 90 days in total.

Additionally, the KRG Representative Offices in London and Washington, DC list the following passport holders as visa-exempt for 30 days:

Israel

 nationals are banned from entering and transiting in Iraq, even if not leaving the aircraft and proceeding by the same flight, except Iraqi Kurdistan where Israeli citizens are only allowed to travel.

COVID-19 pandemic

Fully vaccinated travelers do not need a PCR test prior to arrival in Iraq.

Travelers who cannot receive the Covid-19 vaccine due to health reasons must submit a medical report certified by the Ministry of Health and a negative PCR test.

See also

Visa requirements for Iraqi citizens
Tourism in Iraq
Iraqi nationality law
Iraqi passport

References

Iraq
Foreign relations of Iraq